Epepeotes ambigenus is a species of beetle in the family Cerambycidae. It was described by Chevrolat in 1841. It is known from Taiwan and the Philippines. It feeds on Ficus carica and Ficus nota.

Subspecies
 Epepeotes ambigenus ambigenus (Chevrolat, 1841)
 Epepeotes ambigenus formosanus Breuning, 1943

References

ambigenus
Beetles described in 1841